, provisional designation , is a sub-kilometer asteroid and near-Earth object of the Apollo group, approximately  in diameter. After its discovery by the Catalina Sky Survey at the Catalina Station in Arizona, United States, this potentially hazardous asteroid was briefly listed at a Torino Scale of 1 and a cumulative Palermo Scale of −0.87. It was removed from the Sentry Risk Table on 26 June 2013.

Numbering and naming 

This minor planet was numbered by the Minor Planet Center on 18 May 2019. As of 2019, it has not been named.

Orbit and classification 

 orbits the Sun at a distance of 0.98–1.38 AU once every 15 months (468 days; semi-major axis of 1.18 AU). Its orbit has an eccentricity of 0.17 and an inclination of 26° with respect to the ecliptic.

On 23 November 2059,  will pass  from Earth.

2014 passage 

The 21 May 2014 Earth close approach of  should allow a refinement to the orbit. From 7 May 2014 until 2 June 2014 the asteroid will be brighter than apparent magnitude 20. The asteroid will come to opposition on 18 May 2014 when it will be up all night.

References

External links 
 List of the Potentially Hazardous Asteroids (PHAs), Minor Planet Center
 List Of Apollo Minor Planets (by designation), Minor Planet Center
 
 
 

529366
529366
529366
529366
20140521
20091117